The Orsk constituency (No.144) is a Russian legislative constituency in Orenburg Oblast. The constituency covers eastern Orenburg Oblast.

Members elected

Election results

1993

|-
! colspan=2 style="background-color:#E9E9E9;text-align:left;vertical-align:top;" |Candidate
! style="background-color:#E9E9E9;text-align:left;vertical-align:top;" |Party
! style="background-color:#E9E9E9;text-align:right;" |Votes
! style="background-color:#E9E9E9;text-align:right;" |%
|-
|style="background-color:"|
|align=left|Vladimir Volkov
|align=left|Independent
|
|20.72%
|-
|style="background-color:"|
|align=left|Aleksandr Selifanov
|align=left|Independent
| -
|19.00%
|-
| colspan="5" style="background-color:#E9E9E9;"|
|- style="font-weight:bold"
| colspan="3" style="text-align:left;" | Total
| 
| 100%
|-
| colspan="5" style="background-color:#E9E9E9;"|
|- style="font-weight:bold"
| colspan="4" |Source:
|
|}

1995

|-
! colspan=2 style="background-color:#E9E9E9;text-align:left;vertical-align:top;" |Candidate
! style="background-color:#E9E9E9;text-align:left;vertical-align:top;" |Party
! style="background-color:#E9E9E9;text-align:right;" |Votes
! style="background-color:#E9E9E9;text-align:right;" |%
|-
|style="background-color:"|
|align=left|Vladimir Volkov (incumbent)
|align=left|Communist Party
|
|47.51%
|-
|style="background-color:"|
|align=left|Aleksandr Selifanov
|align=left|Independent
|
|20.78%
|-
|style="background-color:"|
|align=left|Gennady Baturin
|align=left|Liberal Democratic Party
|
|9.99%
|-
|style="background-color:#2C299A"|
|align=left|Viktor Nepomnyashchy
|align=left|Congress of Russian Communities
|
|5.72%
|-
|style="background-color:#000000"|
|colspan=2 |against all
|
|13.35%
|-
| colspan="5" style="background-color:#E9E9E9;"|
|- style="font-weight:bold"
| colspan="3" style="text-align:left;" | Total
| 
| 100%
|-
| colspan="5" style="background-color:#E9E9E9;"|
|- style="font-weight:bold"
| colspan="4" |Source:
|
|}

1999

|-
! colspan=2 style="background-color:#E9E9E9;text-align:left;vertical-align:top;" |Candidate
! style="background-color:#E9E9E9;text-align:left;vertical-align:top;" |Party
! style="background-color:#E9E9E9;text-align:right;" |Votes
! style="background-color:#E9E9E9;text-align:right;" |%
|-
|style="background-color:"|
|align=left|Vladimir Volkov (incumbent)
|align=left|Independent
|
|25.87%
|-
|style="background-color:"|
|align=left|Boris Plokhotnyuk
|align=left|Independent
|
|18.48%
|-
|style="background-color:#3B9EDF"|
|align=left|Ramil Gafarov
|align=left|Fatherland – All Russia
|
|15.40%
|-
|style="background-color:"|
|align=left|Yury Yerofeyev
|align=left|Independent
|
|6.87%
|-
|style="background-color:"|
|align=left|Viktor Isayev
|align=left|Independent
|
|5.61%
|-
|style="background-color:"|
|align=left|Rinat Khamiyev
|align=left|Independent
|
|5.10%
|-
|style="background-color:"|
|align=left|Viktor Fedorov
|align=left|Independent
|
|4.53%
|-
|style="background-color:"|
|align=left|Antonina Koshkina
|align=left|Independent
|
|3.95%
|-
|style="background-color:#084284"|
|align=left|Lidia Kalinina
|align=left|Spiritual Heritage
|
|2.50%
|-
|style="background-color:"|
|align=left|Alla Lavrushko
|align=left|Independent
|
|0.59%
|-
|style="background-color:#000000"|
|colspan=2 |against all
|
|9.19%
|-
| colspan="5" style="background-color:#E9E9E9;"|
|- style="font-weight:bold"
| colspan="3" style="text-align:left;" | Total
| 
| 100%
|-
| colspan="5" style="background-color:#E9E9E9;"|
|- style="font-weight:bold"
| colspan="4" |Source:
|
|}

2003

|-
! colspan=2 style="background-color:#E9E9E9;text-align:left;vertical-align:top;" |Candidate
! style="background-color:#E9E9E9;text-align:left;vertical-align:top;" |Party
! style="background-color:#E9E9E9;text-align:right;" |Votes
! style="background-color:#E9E9E9;text-align:right;" |%
|-
|style="background-color:"|
|align=left|Boris Plokhotnyuk
|align=left|Independent
|
|35.27%
|-
|style="background-color:"|
|align=left|Vladimir Volkov (incumbent)
|align=left|Communist Party
|
|17.40%
|-
|style="background-color:"|
|align=left|Valentina Izmaylova
|align=left|Independent
|
|11.92%
|-
|style="background-color:"|
|align=left|Viktor Tan
|align=left|Agrarian Party
|
|5.33%
|-
|style="background-color:"|
|align=left|Yury Kozhemyakin
|align=left|Independent
|
|3.16%
|-
|style="background-color:"|
|align=left|Igor Volkov
|align=left|Independent
|
|2.98%
|-
|style="background-color:"|
|align=left|Vladimir Silayev
|align=left|Liberal Democratic Party
|
|2.94%
|-
|style="background:"| 
|align=left|Vyacheslav Dyundin
|align=left|Yabloko
|
|2.33%
|-
|style="background:#DBB726"| 
|align=left|Yevgeny Khvostov
|align=left|Democratic Party
|
|0.96%
|-
|style="background:#00A1FF"| 
|align=left|Yury Kukushkin
|align=left|Party of Russia's Rebirth-Russian Party of Life
|
|0.79%
|-
|style="background-color:"|
|align=left|Dmitry Shatalin
|align=left|Independent
|
|0.63%
|-
|style="background-color:#164C8C"|
|align=left|Vasily Kuzmin
|align=left|United Russian Party Rus'
|
|0.53%
|-
|style="background-color:#000000"|
|colspan=2 |against all
|
|12.43%
|-
| colspan="5" style="background-color:#E9E9E9;"|
|- style="font-weight:bold"
| colspan="3" style="text-align:left;" | Total
| 
| 100%
|-
| colspan="5" style="background-color:#E9E9E9;"|
|- style="font-weight:bold"
| colspan="4" |Source:
|
|}

2016

|-
! colspan=2 style="background-color:#E9E9E9;text-align:left;vertical-align:top;" |Candidate
! style="background-color:#E9E9E9;text-align:left;vertical-align:top;" |Party
! style="background-color:#E9E9E9;text-align:right;" |Votes
! style="background-color:#E9E9E9;text-align:right;" |%
|-
|style="background-color: " |
|align=left|Viktor Zavarzin
|align=left|United Russia
|
|43.82%
|-
|style="background-color:"|
|align=left|Aleksandr Ivanov
|align=left|Communist Party
|
|18.85%
|-
|style="background-color:"|
|align=left|Vladimir Mirokhin
|align=left|Liberal Democratic Party
|
|13.12%
|-
|style="background-color:"|
|align=left|Kayrat Kulakhmetov
|align=left|A Just Russia
|
|9.00%
|-
|style="background:"| 
|align=left|Sergey Bentsman
|align=left|Patriots of Russia
|
|3.49%
|-
|style="background:"| 
|align=left|Ruslan Ismagilov
|align=left|Yabloko
|
|2.85%
|-
|style="background:"| 
|align=left|Olga Rybalko
|align=left|People's Freedom Party
|
|2.35%
|-
|style="background-color:"|
|align=left|Sergey Netesanov
|align=left|Party of Growth
|
|1.62%
|-
| colspan="5" style="background-color:#E9E9E9;"|
|- style="font-weight:bold"
| colspan="3" style="text-align:left;" | Total
| 
| 100%
|-
| colspan="5" style="background-color:#E9E9E9;"|
|- style="font-weight:bold"
| colspan="4" |Source:
|
|}

2021

|-
! colspan=2 style="background-color:#E9E9E9;text-align:left;vertical-align:top;" |Candidate
! style="background-color:#E9E9E9;text-align:left;vertical-align:top;" |Party
! style="background-color:#E9E9E9;text-align:right;" |Votes
! style="background-color:#E9E9E9;text-align:right;" |%
|-
|style="background-color: " |
|align=left|Viktor Zavarzin (incumbent)
|align=left|United Russia
|
|31.66%
|-
|style="background-color:"|
|align=left|Sergey Romanenko
|align=left|Communist Party
|
|23.79%
|-
|style="background-color:"|
|align=left|Aleksey Kashirsky
|align=left|A Just Russia — For Truth
|
|10.02%
|-
|style="background: "| 
|align=left|Rinat Khamiyev
|align=left|Yabloko
|
|9.03%
|-
|style="background-color:"|
|align=left|Sergey Putintsev
|align=left|Liberal Democratic Party
|
|6.85%
|-
|style="background-color: "|
|align=left|Aleksandr Belyak
|align=left|Party of Pensioners
|
|6.79%
|-
|style="background-color: " |
|align=left|Ilya Buyanov
|align=left|New People
|
|5.27%
|-
| colspan="5" style="background-color:#E9E9E9;"|
|- style="font-weight:bold"
| colspan="3" style="text-align:left;" | Total
| 
| 100%
|-
| colspan="5" style="background-color:#E9E9E9;"|
|- style="font-weight:bold"
| colspan="4" |Source:
|
|}

Notes

References

Russian legislative constituencies
Politics of Orenburg Oblast